Rothacker is a surname. Notable people with the surname include:

Erich Rothacker (1888–1965), German philosopher
Nate Rothacker (born 1981), American drummer
Rick Rothacker (born 1972), American journalist